Herbie Hancock Trio may refer to:
Herbie Hancock Trio (1977 album)
Herbie Hancock Trio (1982 album)
Herbie Hancock Trio, an accompaniment group for Herbie Hancock